Happy End is a 1967 Czechoslovak comedy film directed by Oldřich Lipský. Theodor Pištěk designed the costumes for the film. The film is told backwards, beginning with the protagonist's death (which he describes as his birth) and ending with his birth (described as his death).

Plot
Happy end tells the life story of a butcher named Bedřich Frydrych; however, it is told entirely in reverse, giving rise to a different story than the one a forward-flowing narrative would depict. It thus begins with Bedřich's "birth" (his execution by guillotine), followed by a "childhood" spent in school (prison), whereupon he sets out into the world and soon marries, although he has to assemble his wife-to-be from various parts (killing and dismembering her, after finding out she is having an affair).

The reversed chronology also applies to dialogue: lines are read in an ostensibly reversed order, variously resulting in sheer situational comedy and dada.

Cast
 Vladimír Menšík - Butcher Bedřich Frydrych
 Jaroslava Obermaierová - Julie
 Josef Abrhám - Ptáček
 Bohuš Záhorský - Father-in-law
 Stella Zázvorková - Mother-in-law
 Jaroslav Štercl - Constable
 Helena Růžičková - Brunette
 Josef Hlinomaz - Commissioner
 Martin Růžek - Prosecutor
 Jiří Steimar
 Bedřich Prokos - Priest
 Mirko Musil - Warden

External links
 

1966 comedy films
1966 films
Czechoslovak black-and-white films
Films directed by Oldřich Lipský
Nonlinear narrative films
Czech comedy films
1960s Czech-language films
1960s Czech films